Joseph Louis Kopnisky (July 25, 1935 – June 19, 2014) was an American football player and coach. He served as the head football coach at Grove City College in Grove City, Pennsylvania from 1973 to 1983, compiling a record of 42–55–3.

Kopnisky played college football at West Virginia University from 1954 to 1956. He was drafted by the Chicago Cardinals in the 1957 NFL Draft.

Head coaching record

Football

References

External links
 

1935 births
2014 deaths
American football ends
Grove City Wolverines football coaches
West Virginia Mountaineers football players
College wrestling coaches in the United States
People from Etna, Pennsylvania
Players of American football from Pennsylvania